LDN Noise (pronounced London Noise) is a British songwriting and record production duo based in London, England. Consisting of songwriter Greg Bonnick and DJ Hayden Chapman, the duo has worked with artists such as Nathan Sykes, Nick Jonas and Chris Brown since 2012, most notably having co-written the 2012's number-one UK hit "Turn Up the Music" for the latter artist.

Bonnick and Chapman, however, are most known for their work with K-pop artists, most notably with soloists and idol groups under the management of SM Entertainment, such as f(x), Exo, Red Velvet and NCT. Describing their sonic style as "different but similar", the duo often incorporates elements from UK garage, drum and bass, funk and '90s house music to their EDM-influenced work, thus creating their own signature sonic style. In addition to their initial work with South Korean artists, the duo has released several digital singles as both a lead artist and a featured act since 2016. LDN Noise has been hailed as one of the "hidden heroes" behind the success of K-pop by The Korea Times.

Background and career 
Both Chapman and Bonnick studied music, but at different colleges, prior to their professional career as songwriters. After meeting through mutual friends, the duo started writing and producing together under the name Agent X with Leon Price, and eventually landed their first writing credit for "Turn Up the Music", which was released as the first single from Chris Brown's fifth studio album Fortune. The song was a commercial success, peaking at number ten on the Billboard Hot 100 chart while topping the UK Singles Chart. After being introduced by their friend Andrew Jackson (who is also a songwriter) to the K-pop market, the duo started writing for the boy bands Shinhwa and Got7, which was Bonnick and Chapman's first work in the K-pop market. According to Chapman, LDN Noise then met SM Entertainment's A&R executives on a songwriting trip to Sweden during mid-2014, and started working with the label closely. They eventually earned their first writing and producing credit under SM with "View" by Shinee, which was a commercial success upon its release, and has since become a frequent collaborator with the label's artists.

In addition to their work with SM Entertainment, LDN Noise also contributed their work to several K-pop artists, notably including Sistar, Girl's Day, Astro and Twice as of 2020.

Discography

Singles

Production and songwriting credits

K-pop

S.M. Entertainment artists

Other K-pop artists

Others

References 

Record production duos
English songwriters
English record producers
English dance music groups
English electronic music duos
British songwriting teams